Maglia may refer to:

 Maglia (surname)
 Maglia (river)